Jana Sinyor (born 1976) is a Canadian television writer and producer. She is best known as the creator of the television comedy-drama series Being Erica and Dark Oracle.

Early life
Sinyor was born in Ottawa, Canada, and raised in the Jewish faith, the daughter of Egypt-born father Albert, a medical-equipment manufacturer, and mother Lynda, a computer programmer and teacher. She received a Bachelor of Arts degree in religious studies from Montreal's McGill University in 1998. She then worked in a call center for a year before taking a screenwriting course at Ryerson University in Toronto and going on to study at the Canadian Film Centre.

Career 
She was a writer on seasons 2 and 3 of Degrassi: The Next Generation.

Sinyor created the comedy drama time-travel series Being Erica, which ran four seasons from 2009 to 2011. She made brief appearances in three episodes of Being Erica playing the role of "Jana". In the program's final episode, "Dr. Erica", she appeared with "Aaron", (the show's executive producer Aaron Martin), playing a bickering couple.

Personal life
As of at least 2010, Sinyor is married to entrepreneur David Singer, with whom she has two children, Jada and Max.

References

External links
 
 Jana Sinyor Cameo Appearance on Being Erica
 Interview: Being Erica Writers Aaron Martin & Jana Sinyor

Living people
Jewish Canadian writers
Canadian television writers
Canadian television producers
Canadian women television producers
Canadian women screenwriters
McGill University alumni
1976 births
Place of birth missing (living people)
Canadian Film Centre alumni
Canadian women television writers